Sonia Nassery Cole (born 1965) is an Afghan-born American human rights activist, filmmaker, and author.

Early life
Sonia Nassery Cole was born in Kabul, Afghanistan, she is the daughter of an Afghan diplomat.. At the early age of fourteen, she fled her war-torn country of Afghanistan amid the chaos of the Soviet invasion of 1979 to seek refuge in the United States of America without her family.

At age seventeen, she felt compelled to write a nine-page letter to President Ronald Reagan about the injustice in her country and plead for help. The president was so touched by her letter that he invited her to the oval office.

Humanitarian work in Afghanistan
After the support of President Ronald Reagan and years of activism thereafter, Sonia founded the Afghanistan World Foundation in 2002 and also channelled her passion to spread awareness about the injustice in her country through documentaries and film. She was instrumental in raising funds used for various necessities such as the construction of a hospital for women and children in Kabul, medical care for land-mine victims, and other causes. Cole primarily deals with improving the conditions for women and children in Afghanistan.

Sonia also befriended singer Natalie Cole while she was working with the Afghan World Foundation, in which she became a board member for the organization along with the likes of numerous influential people including Dr. Henry Kissinger, Prince Albert of Monaco, Anne Heche, Susan Sarandon and more.

Film career
Cole worked in film since 1994. In 2007, she directed the short film The Bread Winner. In 2010, her film The Black Tulip was selected as Afghanistan's official entry for the Best Foreign Language Film at the 83rd Academy Awards. The film won "best picture" awards in Boston Film Festival, Beverly Hills Film Festival, and the Salento Film Festival.

The film, which premiered at the Ariana Cinema Theater on September 23, 2010 and screened at the NATO base as well as an American Embassy, and distributed by SnagFilms, is about a family in Kabul opening a restaurant business after the fall of the Taliban regime. The film received press in The New York Times, The New York Observer, NBC, and ABC.

Her film “I AM YOU” is an independent feature film based on the true story of three Afghan refugees, their will to survive, and the dramatic conditions they endure on their journeys.

Author 
In 2013, she received the Freedom to Write Award from PEN Center USA.  She has a book, "Will I Live Tomorrow?," released in October 2013.

Personal life
She currently resides in New York City and Beverly Hills, California and is now divorced from Christopher H. Cole, but retains his surname. She has one son.

She is the recipient of a "Congressional Recognition" award on December 4, 2006, "Afghan American Sisterhood Award," and the "UN Women Together Award" on June 7, 2012. Cole is a member of the Jodi Solomon Speakers Bureau.

References

Living people
People from Kabul
Activists from New York City
People from Beverly Hills, California
Afghan film directors
Afghan film actresses
Afghan emigrants to the United States
Afghan human rights activists
Afghan socialites
20th-century Afghan actresses
21st-century Afghan actresses
1965 births